Liolaemus zullyae is a species of lizard in the family Iguanidae. It is from Chile and Argentina.

References

zullyae
Lizards of South America
Reptiles of Chile
Reptiles of Argentina
Reptiles described in 1996
Taxa named by José Miguel Alfredo María Cei